Varzahan (or Varzahan Kiliseleri), was an Armenian church founded in the 12th century near village Uğrak (formerly Varzahan), 10 km northwest of Bayburt, in eastern Turkey.

History
Situated in  a settlement called Varzahan in Upper Armenia province of Historical Armenia's northern part. Varzahan was a large Armenian settlement in a 5.7 miles northwest to the Baberd city ( now Bayburt ) of a northernmost district of Upper Armenia called Sper. Most of its population was massacred by Turks during the 18th century. The monastery was damaged in the same period. The archaeologist Austin Henry Layard has described this place in 1849 while travelling from Trebizond to Mosul. Austin Henry Layard said:  ---The only place of any interest, passed during our ride, was a small Armenian village, the remains of a larger, with the ruins of three early Christian churches, or Baptisteries.---

Gallery

Ruines d'eglise Georgienes

See also 
Bayburt

References

External links 
 THE CHURCH OF VARZAHAN at Virtual Ani

Armenian churches in Turkey
Oriental Orthodox congregations established in the 12th century
Christian monasteries established in the 12th century
Destroyed churches
Demolished buildings and structures in Turkey
12th-century establishments in Asia
20th-century disestablishments in Turkey
Buildings and structures demolished in the 20th century